Randy Emberlin is a comic book inker best known for his ink work on the Spider-Man comic books. Per the bio on his website, he currently lives in Portland, Oregon. He has spent the past 30 years working in a variety of creative fields, including as an illustrator of educational books and an animator on over fifty television commercials.

Over the last 20 years he is probably best known for his work as an inker in comics, with a résumé that includes long runs on The Amazing Spider-Man, G.I. Joe, Doctor Strange, Alien Legion, Ghost, and recently the Left Behind series for Tyndale House. He has worked with a wide range of pencilers.

Bibliography (selected) 
Web of Spider-Man (including #117 and many more)
The Amazing Spider-Man (including #345, #347, #362,#390, and many more)
Dark Horse's Ghost (issues 12–16, 18–25, 28–31, 33–36)
Mr. T (the whole 2005 British APComics series)
Buffy the Vampire Slayer series The Origin
Star Wars Tales issue #12 
Star Wars Tales #15
Venom: Along Came A Spider (1996)

References 
Biography on Emberlin's official website

External links 

Living people
Year of birth missing (living people)
American comics artists